The Tampere Lenin Museum is a museum devoted to Vladimir Lenin in Tampere, Finland. It was established in 1946 by the Finland–Soviet Union Society, and today it is run by The Finnish Labour Museum Werstas. It was the first museum dedicated to Lenin outside the Soviet Union, and is now the only surviving one located outside Russia.

The museum is located in the Tampere Workers' Hall. Built in 1900, the building hosted underground meetings of the Russian Social Democratic Labour Party in 1905 and 1906. At the 1905 meeting, Lenin met Joseph Stalin in person for the first time. The museum has a permanent exhibition with material related to Lenin's life and the history of the Soviet Union. It also organizes varying exhibitions on different themes.

The museum was awarded the Order of Friendship of Peoples in 1986 by the council of Supreme Soviet of the Soviet Union. Since the collapse of the Soviet Union, the museum has developed a more critical view to Lenin's work and the Soviet Union.

References

External links 

Tampere Lenin Museum Official Homepage

Museums in Tampere
Monuments and memorials to Vladimir Lenin
Recipients of the Order of Friendship of Peoples
Finland–Soviet Union relations